Job Caudwell  (8 December 1820 – 5 June 1908) was an English publisher and bookseller of temperence and reform literature, and activist for temperance and vegetarianism. He published and edited multiple periodicals and authored a vegetarian cookbook.

Biography 
Caudwell was born in 1820 at Drayton Manor, Abingdon, the seventh son of William Caudwell; he had 20 siblings. Caudwell grew up in rural Berkshire and later spent many years travelling extensively. He studied botany and undertook "antiqiuarian researches". Caudwell made it his life's goal to treat social problems he observed, which he considered to be, at their root, caused by alcohol. 

Caudwell was a committed teetotal vegetarian and a member of the London Vegetarian Association and Anti-Compulsory Vaccination League. He published and edited the periodical, Temperance Star from 1857 to 1876, and the Temperance Spectator from 1859 to 1867; he later published the Journal of Health as well as the vegetarian cookbook, Vegetarian Cookery for the Million in 1864. Caudwell was also a keen outdoorsman and was noted for successfully summiting Ben Nevis as a vegetarian. In July 1859, he formed a publishing partnership with fellow temperance and vegetarianism activist William Horsell at 335, The Strand; their partnership was dissolved in September 1860. His publishing office also served as a homeopathic institute, from where Caudwell dispensed his own brand of homeopathic cocoa. In 1863, Caudwell was elected a Fellow of the Royal Society of Literature. In February 1865, a memoir and portrait of Caudwell was published in The Illustrated News of the World, of which Caudwell was editor. In 1881 he laid the corner stone of Putney Methodist Church. 

Caudwell married Eliza Cooper Braine in 1860; they had four sons. His wife died in 1887 and he married Eliza Harvey in 1901. 

Caudwell died in 1908 in Wandsworth.

References

External links 
 

1820 births
1908 deaths
British anti-vaccination activists
British homeopaths
British vegetarianism activists
English booksellers
English cookbook writers
English magazine editors
English publishers (people)
English reformers
English temperance activists
Fellows of the Royal Society of Literature
People associated with the Vegetarian Society
People from Abingdon-on-Thames
Vegetarian cookbook writers